Kasperi Heikkinen (born 1980) is a guitar player who is best known as a member of Finnish symphonic power metal band Amberian Dawn. He played in the band from early 2007 until late 2012. He is also the guitarist for Finnish metal bands Merging Flare and Guardians of Mankind, which is a Gamma Ray tribute band. Heikkinen performed with German metal band U.D.O. from 2013 until 2017. He currently resides in Helsinki, Finland.

As a touring musician, Heikkinen has played on part of the German Power Metal band Gamma Ray's Majestic tour in 2006 following an injury to Henjo Richter. On their most recent to the Metal-tour, Heikkinen replaced Henjo Richter once again for shows scheduled in Germany and Czech Republic in March 2010. He also shared stage with his fellow axemen Hansen and Richter making "a three guitar special" for the encore numbers at the Nosturi club in Helsinki, Finland on 29 March 2010.

In 2015, Heikkinen was brought into a new symphonic metal band called Beast in Black by fellow Finnish guitar player Anton Kabanen. Beast in Black released their debut album in November 2017 by the metal label Nuclear Blast.

Discography

With Merging Flare 
 Reverence, Disentertainment (2011)
 Beyond The Blackhole/Under The Fire, Split-EP (Guardians of Mankind / Merging Flare), Imperiumi Records (2007)
 Hell To Pay, Promo-EP (2005)
 S/T, Promo-EP (2003)

With Amberian Dawn 
 Circus Black, Spinefarm (2012)
 End of Eden, Spinefarm (2010)
 The Clouds of Northland Thunder, Suomen Musiikki (2009)
 River of Tuoni, Suomen Musiikki (2008)

With Elenium 
 Them Used Gods, Self Financed EP (2002)
 For Giving For Getting, Rage of Achilles (2003)
 Caught in Wheel, Kampas Records (2007)

With U.D.O. 
 Steelhammer, AFM Records (2013)
 Decadent, AFM Records (2015)

With Beast in Black 
Berserker, Nuclear Blast (2017)
From Hell with Love, Nuclear Blast (2019)
Dark Connection, Nuclear Blast (2021)

Other 
 Conquest: The Harvest, self-financed (2011)
 Heavy Metal Perse: "Eripura", Dethrone Music (2006), guest guitar solo on track #4 "Pahaksi Parkittu Lalli"
 Heavy Metal Perse / Guardians of Mankind: Legenda Taikamiekasta/Kuninkaidenlaakso, Split-EP, Imperiumi Records (2004)
 Omnium Gatherum: "Spirits And August Light", Rage of Achilles (2002), guest guitar solo on track #3 "The Perfumed Garden"
 Dark Sarah: "Attack of Orym", Riena Productions (2023), guest guitar solo on track #3 "Invincible" and track #7 "Delirium"

Equipment
Kasperi Heikkinen is on the artist roster of Ibanez guitars and uses the following models:

 Ibanez Jem77FP
 Ibanez Jem77BRMR
 Ibanez Jem77VBK
 Ibanez Jem777LNG
 Ibanez UV777PBK
 Ibanez UV7PWH
 Ibanez UV777GR
 Ibanez UV77MC
 Ibanez PGM100RE
 Ibanez RGT320QRBB
 Ibanez Rocket Roll (Flying V)

Heikkinen uses Mesa/Boogie amplification exclusively.

 Mesa/Boogie TriAxis Preamp
 Mesa/Boogie 2:50 Amp
 Mesa/Boogie Rectifier 4x12 cabinet

Effects and accessories

 TC Electronics G-Major multi-effect processor

References

External links
Kasperi Heikkinen's Myspace
Amberian Dawn Official Website
Merging Flare Official Website

Amberian Dawn members
1980 births
Finnish guitarists
Finnish heavy metal guitarists
Finnish male guitarists
Living people
Rhythm guitarists
U.D.O. members